Florian Mayer was the defending champion but chose not to defend his title.

Sergiy Stakhovsky won the title after defeating Matteo Berrettini 6–7(4–7), 7–6(8–6), 6–3 in the final.

Seeds

Draw

Finals

Top half

Bottom half

References
Main Draw
Qualifying Draw

Tilia Slovenia Open - Singles
2017 Singes